The Northcott Theatre is a theatre situated on the Streatham Campus of the University of Exeter, Exeter, Devon, England.  It opened in 1967 and was run until 2010 by the Northcott Theatre Foundation, when the company ceased operating after a period in administration. The theatre is now known as Exeter Northcott Theatre and became a registered charity (no. 1151620) in June 2013.

History
The Northcott is the seventh building in Exeter to be used as a theatre.

In 1962, the Theatre Royal, Exeter, was demolished to be replaced by an office block; however, there were many people in Exeter who were determined that the city should not be without a theatre for very long. Early in 1962, Mr George Vernon Northcott (1891-1963) had started negotiations with the board of directors of the Theatre Royal with the view to "saving" the theatre, and its re-creation as a theatre and arts centre. A small group from the University of Exeter prepared a memorandum explaining how they saw the Theatre Royal functioning in the kind of way that Mr Northcott visualised and outlining some ideas. They submitted this memorandum to the board of directors of the Theatre Royal and to Mr Northcott. After some time, however, negotiations failed to develop and the Theatre Royal was sold.

For a time, informal discussions continued between Mr Northcott and the university, and later in 1962 more formal contacts were made. The then vice-chancellor, Sir James Cook, pointed out that the university had for some time earmarked a site for a theatre on its development plan and it was possible that, in collaboration with the university, Mr Northcott's ideas for a theatre and arts centre could be realised.

Ultimately, the university offered a site: Mr Northcott established a trust with a benefaction of £100,000 (later supplemented by donations of £50,000 from the Calouste Gulbenkian Foundation and from other bodies), to establish the "Northcott Devon Theatre and Arts Centre", which would serve the needs of the community in the region. The Northcott Theatre opened with a production of The Merchant of Venice, starring Tony Church, its first Artistic Director, on 2 November 1967. Barbara Hepworth unveiled one of her sculptures in the foyer on opening night. The architects were Sir William Holford and Partners and the theatre consultant Michael Warre.

Actors who spent time in the Northcott company in their earlier careers include Polly James, Lesley Joseph, John Nettles, Robert Lindsay, Brian Protheroe, Bob Peck, Geraldine James, Paul Jesson, Joanna Tope, Caroline John, Celia Imrie, Nick Brimble and Imelda Staunton; and Nicholas Hytner professionally directed his first straight dramas here. In its first years, the company originated a number of plays of West Country interest, including new historical drama by Jack Emery and an adaptation of the Cornish Mystery Play Cycle. It also toured productions throughout the area.

The Northcott has a strong history as a producing repertory theatre, that is to say the bulk of its historical productions were staged by the company itself, rather than being brought in from elsewhere.
As built the theatre was given a semicircular main house auditorium seating 433 people with an orchestra pit on a mechanical lift; being also configurable as theatre in the round or cinema. The capacity of the venue was increased in the 2007 refurbishment and it can now seat 464.

Expansion

In March 2005, the directors of the Northcott announced that planning permission and funding would be sought for a £3.1 million building project to expand front of house facilities and increase the capacity of the auditorium to 538 seats.

Having raised £2.1 million, the theatre was closed for refurbishment in January 2007 and reopened on 12 December 2007, near the fortieth anniversary of its first opening.

The refurbishment provided the following;
 New auditorium seating
 Additional wheelchair spaces
 A lift to all public levels, providing full disabled access
 Improved disabled facilities
 Redecorated and upgraded public areas
 Additional space for eating and drinking in the foyer
 An enhanced entrance area
 Refurbished and improved technical areas

The day before the rebranded Exeter Northcott reopened in December 2007, Arts Council England threatened withdrawal of its entire £547,000 annual grant. The loss of a third of the theatre's operating costs would result in a drastic cutback in production and job losses, if the theatre even managed to stay open. However, on 1 February 2008 the Arts Council England announced a reprieve for the Exeter Northcott and its continued funding.

Following the discovery of a legacy of accounting problems inherited from the previous management, the trustees placed the theatre into administration on 25 February 2010. This decision was opposed by Arts Council England which had earlier sent in a forensic accountant to investigate the extent of the problem. These investigations had not yet been completed. Geoff Myers, chairman of the theatre's trustees, said: "We took this decision with a heavy heart but when presented with the latest financial information we had no choice but to place the theatre into administration. It is to be hoped that a way can be found to effect a rescue of the theatre." Exeter City Council and the university have agreed to help find a way to save the theatre. On 5 June 2010 it was confirmed by administrators Begbies Traynor that a new company set up by the university had purchased the theatre, the Exeter Northcott Theatre Company, and the immediate future of the theatre was thought to have been secured. In September 2014 Exeter Northcott Theatre announced a new major sponsorship agreement with law firm Browne Jacobson. In 2015, under Artistic and Executive Director Paul Jepson, the theatre returned to producing its own work with A Christmas Carol followed by Betrayal, by Harold Pinter, in 2016. In 2017, the theatre made a return to producing its own pantomime with Dick Whittington, directed by Tony Lidington In January 2018 a performance exploring epilepsy and created by the theatre in collaboration with the University of Exeter, Beyond My Control, went on a national tour

Artistic directors 
1967–1971: Tony Church (Artistic Director), Robin Phillips (Associate Director), Bernard Goss (Writer in Residence)
 1971–1974: Jane Howell (Artistic Director), Jack Emery & Kevin Robinson (Associate Directors)
 1974–1977: Geoffrey Reeves (Artistic Director), Clive Barker (Associate Director)
 1978–1980: Richard Digby Day (Artistic Director), Michael Winter & Crispin Thomas (Associate Directors)
 1981–1985: Stewart Trotter (Artistic Director)
 1986–1990: George Roman (Artistic Director), Martin Harvey (Associate Director)
 1991–1998: John Durnin (Artistic Director), Tim Carroll (Associate Director), Charlotte Conquest & Gillian King (Assistant Directors), Robert Shearman (Writer in Residence)
 1998–2008: Ben Crocker (Artistic Director)
 2008–2010: Rebecca Manson Jones (position retitled to 'Creative Director')
 2015–2018: Paul Jepson (artistic and executive director)
 2018- : Daniel Buckroyd

See also
Barnfield Theatre

References

Further reading
 
  
 Tabs 25(4) (December 1967)

External links
Video report about the refurbishment of the theatre in 2007 by BizView.tv

University of Exeter
Theatres in Devon
Buildings and structures in Exeter
Tourist attractions in Exeter